Nestor Dmytriw (1863 – May 27, 1925) was a Ukrainian Catholic priest, author and translator, born in Scherebky (Жеребки), Galicia, Austria-Hungary. Shortly after his ordination by Metropolitan bishop Sylvester Sembratovych in 1894, he came to the United States in 1895 and settled in Mount Carmel, Pennsylvania.  In the US, he quickly became involved with missionary work and journalism through the Jersey City, New Jersey paper Svoboda.

United States 

Nestor Dmytriw was one of the so-called American Circle, a group of young seminarians who, while still in Lviv, resolved to emigrate to the United States in order to improve the religious, civic, and cultural status of the Ukrainian immigrants.  Dmytriw and Cyril Genik both “shared in Joseph Oleskow’s views on the needs of the peasantry.”   “In 1895, after his ordination, Dmytriw himself arrived in the United States, where he combined missionary work among the Ukrainian industrial labourers of Pennsylvania with journalism. He became associated with the first Ukrainian-language newspaper in North America, Svoboda [Liberty], which originated in Jersey City, N.J. The paper, which featured stories about the immigrant experience in the United States and Canada, was widely read in Galicia and thus became the first major link between North America and Austrian Ukraine.”

Canada 

In 1897, Dmytriw travelled from the United States to Canada at Joseph Oleskow’s request.  Through the Ruthenian National Association, Dmytriw arrived in April 1897 to  serve the spiritual needs of the Ukrainian Canadian settlers.  Able to speak Ukrainian, German and English he became an interpreter for Canadian immigration.  In Canadian history, Dmytriw's most notable contribution is in writing about the history and tribulations of early Ukrainian settlers.

Missionary work on the Canadian Prairie 
St. Michael’s Ukrainian Catholic Church, the oldest surviving Ukrainian Catholic Church in Canada, was built on the site where Father Dmytriw celebrated liturgy on April 12, 1897, shortly upon his arrival in Canada. The parishioners erected a large commemorative cross on the site, and at Dmytriw's suggestion, a log church was built in 1898. The church has since been moved from its original location in the Trembowla area, Rural Municipality of Dauphin.

In the fall of 1897, Father Dmytriw spoke up in an article in the Winnipeg Free Press defending the Ukrainian immigrants, deflecting a scathing attack on them by another newspaper.  Travelling among them as he did, he was able to describe their industriousness and their well-managed homesteads.

The Ruthenians
REV. NESTOR DMYTROW TELLS OF THE ALBERTA COLONY.
Prosperity of the Early Settlers and Poverty of the Most Recent – Destitute Ones Should not Be Sent There –

Dmytriw’s records showed 15 families, with children, 78 persons, were settled in Trembowla, the oldest Ukrainian settlement in the vicinity of Dauphin in 1897.  In Winnipeg, the population was 200, some spending their winter in the Immigration Hall, waiting to leave for their homesteads in spring, while others had decided to stay in the city and were looking for employment. As the first Ukrainian priest to visit the prairies, Dmytriw began organizing the first Ukrainian religious groups in the area.

While in Alberta in 1897, Dmytriw was informed by Bishop Legal that, “It would be impossible to have two Catholic churches in Canada.”  Dmytriw advised the Ukrainian immigrants to be wary of the French clergy, when Legal “secured land for the Ukrainian Catholic church in Edna-Star, then tried to have it registered with his episcopal corporation without consulting the settlers.” 

When living in Canada, Dmytriw worked at the immigration bureau in Winnipeg.  This helped him in his religious endeavors, giving him the funds to travel throughout the western provinces.  The Ukrainian settlers were poor and could not help him in this respect.

Departure 

Dmytriw was only in Canada until August 1898. During his stay, he organized the first Ukrainian parishes in Trembowla, Manitoba, Stuartburn, Manitoba and Edna, Alberta and was an advocate of a separate Ukrainian Catholic church in Canada.  This was initially opposed by the Canadian Catholic hierarchy, especially Archbishop Adélard Langevin, but came to fruition with the appointment of Nykyta Budka as apostolic exarch for Ukrainian Canadian Catholics.

Father Nestor Dmytriw died on May 27, 1925 in Elizabeth, New Jersey.

See also 

Achille Delaere

References

Bibliography 
 Martynowych, Orest T.  Ukrainians in Canada: The Formative Period, 1891-1924. Canadian Institute of Ukrainian Studies Press, University of Alberta, Edmonton, 1991.
 Marunchak, Michael, H. The Ukrainian Canadians: A History, Winnipeg, Ottawa: Ukrainian Free Academy of Sciences, 1970.
Gerus, Oleh W. “Nestor Dmytriw”, Dictionary of Canadian Biography.
Subtelny, Orest. Ukrainians In North America, An Illustrated History, University of Toronto Press, Toronto, 1991.

External links 

Biography at the Dictionary of Canadian Biography Online
 
Svoboda [text in Ukrainian]
Fr. Nestor Dmytriw's Gravesite in Hillside, NJ

1863 births
1925 deaths
19th-century American clergy
19th-century Austrian clergy
19th-century Canadian civil servants
19th-century Eastern Catholic clergy
20th-century American clergy
20th-century Eastern Catholic clergy
American Eastern Catholics
American expatriate writers in Canada
American people of Ukrainian descent
Austrian Eastern Catholics
Austrian expatriates in Canada
Austro-Hungarian emigrants to the United States
Austro-Hungarian writers
Christian clergy in Canada
Immigrant rights activists
Members of the Ukrainian Greek Catholic Church
People from Ternopil Oblast
People from the Kingdom of Galicia and Lodomeria
19th-century travel writers
Ukrainian Austro-Hungarians
Ukrainian Canadian religion
Austro-Hungarian Eastern Catholic priests
Eastern Catholic missionaries
Missionaries by mission continent
Christian missionaries in Canada